Czech Baseball Extraliga is a baseball league and the highest level of baseball in the Czech Republic. The league started in 1979, when Tempo Praha won the first championship. In 2020, the Extraliga was one of the first sports leagues in Europe, and the first major baseball league in the world, to restart following lockdowns concerning the COVID-19 pandemic.

Teams

Winners

References

Baseball leagues in Europe
Professional sports leagues in the Czech Republic